Luick is a German surname. Notable people with the surname include:

John Luick (1840–1938), American businessman 
Karl Luick (1865–1935), Austrian Anglicist, rector of the Wien University
Larry Luick (born 1958), American politician
William Henry Luick, the namesake of the historic William Henry Luick Farmhouse

See also
Luik (surname)